Emmy Julia Carolina Kocula Abrahamson (1976) is a Swedish actress turned author. Abrahamson grew up in Moscow, then studied drama in London, worked as an actor in Amsterdam then as a director and artistic director in Vienna. In 2009, she returned to live again in Sweden.

Her literary debut was in 2011. The following year, she had a book nominated for a Prize in the category for children's and young adult literature.

According to Emmy, she met her husband, Vic Kocula, during her stay in Amsterdam. Vic was then a homeless man, who followed her back to Vienna. Emmy has written a book about that, How to fall in love with a man who lives in a bush. They have two children.

References

1976 births
Swedish-language writers
Living people
20th-century Swedish novelists
20th-century Swedish women writers
Women writers of young adult literature